Vohilaid is a small Estonian island in the Hari kurk strait of the Väinameri in the Baltic Sea.

References

External links
 WorldCity BD.com
 Tageo.com

Estonian islands in the Baltic
Hiiumaa Parish